Turnbull Field was an aerodrome near Gili Gili, Papua New Guinea.

History
Built by the US Army 2nd Battalion of 43rd Engineer General Service Regiment (less Company E), during the Battle of Milne Bay during World War II with assistance from the 105th Naval Construction Battalion. Originally known as No. 3 Strip, the airfield was renamed Turnbull Field on 14 September 1942 in honour of Royal Australian Air Force Squadron Leader Peter Turnbull, who was killed in an aircraft crash. Taxiways and revetments extended off both sides of the runway.

The aerodrome was abandoned in February 1944 and has been disused since the end of World War II.

Allied Units Based at Turnbull Field
36th Fighter Squadron, 8th Fighter Group (18 September 1942 – 22 February 1943), P-39
403d Bombardment Squadron, 43d Bombardment Group (23 November 1942 – 21 January 1943), B-17
82d Tactical Reconnaissance Squadron, 71st Tactical Reconnaissance Group (6–23 November 1943), B-25, P-39
418th Night Fighter Squadron (2–22 November 1943), P-38, P-70
421st Night Fighter Squadron (4 January – 1 February 1944), P-70
No. 6 Squadron RAAF, (Lockheed Hudson)
 9 Battery, 2/3 Australian Light Anti-aircraft Regiment

See also
Naval Base Milne Bay

References

External links
Turnbull Field details
Pacific War Airfields Project

Airports in Papua New Guinea
Airfields of the United States Army Air Forces in Papua New Guinea
World War II airfields in Papua New Guinea